Facção Central is a Brazilian rap group formed in the year 1998 the new training members Dum-Dum, DJ Binho.

It was formed in 1989 in São Paulo by left the group and they were replaced by Dum Dum and DJ Binho.

At the beginning of 1998 Garga left the band and Erick 12 became a new member, but nowadays he is just the group's music producer.

Eduardo (composer and performer) and Dum-Dum (performer) were born and grew up in favelas of São Paulo in an environment where social violence, criminality, drug trafficking and drug addiction were rampant. This violent past became a source of inspiration to Eduardo's political lyrics.

Discography

Compilation albums 

 1993 - Movimento Rap Vol. 2
 1999 - Família Facção

Studio albums 

 1994 - Juventude de Atitude
 1998 - Estamos de Luto
 1999 - Versos Sangrentos
 2001 - A Marcha Fúnebre Prossegue
 2003 - Direto do Campo de Extermínio
 2006 - O Espetáculo do Circo dos Horrores

Live albums 
 2005 - Facção Central - Ao Vivo

Members
 Dum-Dum - (1989–present)
 Eduardo - (1989–2013)
 Moysés - (2013–2014)
 DJ Erick 12 - (1997–2001)
 DJ Garja - (1989–1996)

References

Brazilian hip hop groups
Musical groups established in 1989
Horrorcore groups
Underground hip hop groups
Gangsta rap groups